Pant is a village and community on the outskirts of Merthyr Tydfil, a large former mining town in the South Wales Valleys, Wales. Pant is notable for being the starting point of the Brecon Mountain Railway, and the site of the former Morlais railway tunnel, which runs underneath the village and emerges in the middle of it. The population of the community at the 2011 census was 2,656.

References

External links 

 Old Merthyr Tydfil: Pantyscallog (Pant) - Historical Photographs of Pantyscallog (Pant), Merthyr Tydfil.

Villages in Merthyr Tydfil County Borough
Communities in Merthyr Tydfil County Borough